Jaisukhlal Hathi (19 January 1909 – 2 February 1982) was born at Muli, Saurashtra, in the Indian state of Gujarat. He served as a Union Minister in the Indian Government and also as governor of Punjab and Haryana. He was as a member of the Constituent Assembly, Lok Sabha, and Rajya Sabha. He was born in Surendranagar in 1909 and died in 1982.

Early life
His father Lalshankar Hathi was from Saurashtra. He married Padmavati on 27 May 1927, and he had four sons and one daughter. He studied at Alfred High School in Rajkot district, after which he moved to Bombay and cleared the Advocates Examination to join the Bar Council.

Administrative career
In 1943, he was appointed District and Sessions Judge in the erstwhile Rajkot State. In 1948, he became the Chief Secretary of the erstwhile Princely State of Saurashtra.

Parliamentary career
He was a member of the Constituent Assembly (1946-47) representing the State of Saurashtra. He was also elected to the Provisional Parliament in 1950. He served as a member of the Rajya Sabha from 3 April 1952 to 12 March 1957; and in 1957, he was elected to the Second Lok Sabha representing the Indian National Congress. Hathi was elected to Rajya Sabha in April 1962 and served till 3 April 1968, following which he was reelected the same day and served till 2 April 1974.

Minister and Governor
Hathi served as Deputy Minister, Minister of State, and as Minister of Irrigation in the Union Council of Ministers holding portfolios of Irrigation and Power, Supply, Home Affairs, Defence from 1952 to 1962. He served as Minister of Labour and Rehabilitation from 1962 to 1964 and 1967–69. He was appointed Governor of Haryana on 14 August 1976 and he served till 23 September 1977, following which he was transferred to Punjab on 24 September 1977, where he served till 26 August 1981. He resigned from Governorship of Punjab on health grounds.

Other Administrative Positions and Public Life
He headed the Commission on Drugs and Pharmaceuticals in 1974, where he submitted a report that is known as the Hathi Commission report (1975). He also served as Chairman of National Lawyers Forum. He was a Director in the Press Trust of India. He worked with Bharatiya Vidya Bhavan since its inception serving as Chairman of Bhavan's International Chapter and as Chairman of Central Kendra Committee. He served as a trustee of the Somnath and Dwarka Temples.

Writings
He wrote "Position of Indian States In Federation" in 1939 with an aim to define the roles that various Indian states would play in the Indian federation. 
"Sidelights on Indian Princess" was his second publication which was published in 1975. He also wrote a number of short stories for Bhavan's Journal from 1970 to 1974. His biography was titled "As It Happened."

References

1909 births
1982 deaths
Governors of Punjab, India
Rajya Sabha members from Gujarat
Governors of Haryana
Members of the Constituent Assembly of India
India MPs 1957–1962
Indian National Congress politicians from Gujarat
Leaders of the Rajya Sabha